Digama septempuncta is a moth of the  family Erebidae. It is found on Rodrigues.

External links
 Species info

Aganainae
Moths of Madagascar
Moths of Mauritius
Moths described in 1910
Fauna of Rodrigues